Portobello RFC, formerly known as Portobello FP, is a rugby union side based in Edinburgh, Scotland.

Their 2nd XV play in the East Reserve League 2.

History
Portobello was founded as a former pupils club of Portobello High School, once one of the largest schools in Europe. It is no longer purely a haven for former pupils and welcomes players from all over the rugby world. They play their rugby at Cavalry Park in the shadow of Arthur's Seat

The club was reformed in 1954 and enjoyed fixtures against the elite of the established "circuit". Portobello tried for many years to climb out of the old Edinburgh District League achieving that in the 1970s climbing through Divisions 7 to 2 in successive seasons.

As recently as 2007 we were a club in doldrums with playing membership down and results on the field less than inspiring. Rather bizarrely the event that acted as a catalyst for improvement was a fire which decimated the clubhouse in May of that year. This unfortunate inferno brought friends, members and players (current and past) together to rebuild the club physically and metaphorically.

The subsequent season saw a significant upturn in the playing fortunes with 1st and 2nd XV both turning in more than respectable performances. The icing on the cake was a glorious cup run culminating in an appearance in the National Plate final at Murrayfield on 3 May 2008.

The 2008–09 season saw the 1st XV finishing runners up in their league while the 2nd XV finished top of the tree in their respective division. In 2009–10 the top team were once again pipped for the title by North Berwick and the SXY2S finished 3rd in their respective league.

The club also runs a thriving Youth Section with teams at all Micro (Primary 1 and Primary 2), Mini (Primary 3 – Primary 7), Midi (S1 up to under-16) and Colts (under-18) levels. All coaching is run by experienced and qualified coaches

The Gaelic football team, Dúnedin Connolly GAC currently share their ground.

Portobello Sevens

The club run the Portobello Sevens tournament.

Honours

Portobello Sevens
 Champions: 1983, 1984, 1990
Edinburgh and Lothian U-16
 Champions:  1993
 Runners up: 1992
Peebles Sevens
 Champions: 1987, 1990
Walkerburn Sevens
 Champions : 1974, 1981, 1983, 1984
Livingston Sevens
 Champions: 1974, 1978, 1979, 1981
Grangemouth Sevens
 Champions: 1983
 Gala Y.M. Sevens
 Champions: 1973
 Royal HSFP Sevens
 Champions: 1984, 1986, 1987
 Preston Lodge Sevens
 Champions: 1986
 Broughton Sevens
 Champions: 2009
 Alloa Sevens
 Champions: 1974, 1975, 1976, 1977
 Lismore Sevens
 Champions: 1978
 Holy Cross Sevens
 Champions: 1995
 Glenrothes Sevens
 Champions: 1980
 Haddington Sevens
 Champions: 1982, 1984, 1985
 Edinburgh Northern Sevens
 Champions: 1970
 Edinburgh District Sevens
 Champions: 1973, 1974, 1983
 Musselburgh Sevens
 Champions: 1984
 North Berwick Sevens
 Champions: 1979

Notable former players

Glasgow Warriors players

References
 Massie, Allan A Portrait of Scottish Rugby (Polygon, Edinburgh)

External links
 Portobello on pitchero.com

Scottish rugby union teams
Rugby union in Edinburgh
Portobello, Edinburgh